Graham Standing (20 December 1860 – 23 October 1909) was a rugby union international who represented England from 1882 to 1883.

Early life
Graham Standing was born on 20 December 1860 in Clapham, Surrey (now London).

Rugby union career
Standing played his club rugby for Blackheath F.C. He made his international debut on 16 December 1882 at St Helen's, Swansea in the Wales vs England match. Of the 2 matches he played for his national side he was on the winning side on both occasions. He played his final match for England on 5 February 1883 at Whalley Range, Manchester in the England vs Ireland match.

References

1860 births
1909 deaths
Blackheath F.C. players
England international rugby union players
English rugby union players
Rugby union forwards
Rugby union players from Clapham